The South Korea national kabaddi team (also known as Korea Republic national kabaddi team) represents South Korea in international kabaddi competitions.

Kabaddi is a growing sport in South Korea. South Korea national team is ranked 3rd in the world. Many Korean players play in the Pro Kabaddi league in India.

Korean captain Jang Kun Lee is one of the most famous international players in the Pro Kabaddi league.

Korean players are known for their agility & speed in the game.

In 2016 Kabaddi World Cup, South Korea finished at 3rd place losing to Iran in the semi-finals. South Korea was the only team to beat eventual winner India in the entire tournament.

South Korea was also invited to participate in 2018 Dubai Kabaddi Masters, being one of the top 4 Kabaddi nations in the world.

South Korea has also defeated India at the 2018 Asian Games which was their first defeat at the tournament. They also bagged their first silver medal.

Team

Tournament records

Asian Games

Men's team

Women's team

World Cup
Men's Team

Women's Team

References

National kabaddi teams
Kabaddi